The men's 25 metre pistol shooting event at the 2011 Pan American Games was held on October 19 at the Pan American Shooting Polygon in Guadalajara. The defending Pan American Games champion is Sandra Uptagrafft of the United States.

The event consisted of two rounds: a qualifier and a final. In the qualifier, each shooter fired 60 shots with a pistol at 25 metres distance. Scores for each shot were in increments of 1, with a maximum score of 10. The first 30 shots were in the precision stage, with series of 5 shots being shot within 5 minutes. The second set of 30 shots gave shooters 3 seconds to take each shot.

The top 8 shooters in the qualifying round moved on to the final round. There, they fired an additional 20 shots. These shots scored in increments of .1, with a maximum score of 10.9. They were fired in four sets of 5 rapid fire shots. The total score from all 80 shots was used to determine final ranking.

Schedule
All times are Central Standard Time (UTC-6).

Records
The existing world and Pan American Games records were as follows.

Results
25 athletes from 14 countries took part.

Qualification round

Final

References

Shooting at the 2011 Pan American Games
Pan